Jessica Jennifer Williams (March 17, 1948 – March 10, 2022) was an American jazz pianist and composer.

Early life

Williams was born in Baltimore, Maryland, on March 17, 1948. She started playing the piano at age four, began music lessons with a private teacher at five, and at age seven was enrolled into the Peabody Preparatory. She studied classical music and ear training with Richard Aitken and George Bellows at the Peabody Conservatory of Music.

Williams showed an ability to see each note's color as she heard it, consistent with synesthesia. She discussed how this inspired her early interest in the piano in a televised interview with the BBC. Williams also had the ability to play anything she heard. At age twelve, she was listening to Dave Brubeck, Miles Davis, and Charles Mingus. She knew she was destined to become a jazz pianist.

Williams began performing jazz in her teens, playing with Richie Cole, Buck Hill, and Mickey Fields. In a radio interview with Marian McPartland on NPR's Piano Jazz, she stated that her main influences were not pianists, but horn players, especially Miles Davis and John Coltrane.

Musical career 

In June 1976, Williams began performing regularly with the "Philly Joe" Jones band in New Jersey, and with Lex Humphries in Philadelphia and New York City, before moving to the West Coast in October 1976.

In 1977, Williams moved to San Francisco, where she played in house bands at the Keystone Korner. She worked with Eddie Harris, Tony Williams, Stan Getz, Bobby Hutcherson, and Charlie Haden, eventually leading her own jazz trio, and recording regularly for several decades.

In 1997, Williams established her own record label, Red and Blue Recordings. She also started her publishing company, JJW Music/ASCAP, and an internet mail order business.

Williams appeared at the 2004 and 2006 "Mary Lou Williams Women in Jazz Festival" at the John F. Kennedy Center for the Performing Arts in Washington, D.C. She also appeared in festivals and venues worldwide, including The Purcell Room in London, The Bern Jazz Festival, The Monterey Jazz Festival, The New Morning in Paris, Spivey Hall in Georgia, and hundreds of other venues.  She was a guest on NPR's Fresh Air with Terry Gross, and Marian McPartland's Piano Jazz on NPR, as well as being interviewed by the BBC in Brecon, Wales.

In 2012, Williams had a Spinal fusion with internal instrumentation at Swedish Hospital's Neurosurgery Unit in Seattle, WA, and subsequently lost her ability to perform. She lived with her husband in the Pacific Northwest, and no longer toured. She continued to make new music, including electronic music and neoclassical music, and remained a lifelong advocate of civil rights.

Death
Williams died on March 10, 2022, a week before her 74th birthday.

Awards and honors

 Grammy nomination, Nothin' But the Truth, 1986
 Grammy nomination, Live at Yoshi's, Vol. 1, 2004
 Grant, National Endowment for the Arts 
 Grant, Rockefeller Foundation, 1989
 Grant, Alice B. Toklas Grant for Women Composers, 1992
 Guggenheim Fellowship, 1995
 Keys to the City, Sacramento, California
 Keys to the City, San Mateo, California
 Artist of the Year, Santa Cruz County, California, 2002
 Jazz Record of the Year, Jazz Journal International Reader's Poll

Selected discography

 1976 Portal of Antrim (Adelphi)
 1978 Portraits (Adelphi)
 1979 Orgonomic Music (Clean Cuts)
 1980 Rivers of Memory (Clean Cuts)
 1982 Update featuring Eddie Harris (Clean Cuts)
 1986 Nothin' But the Truth (BlackHawk)
 1990 And Then, There's This (Timeless)
 1992 Live at Maybeck Recital Hall, Vol. 21 (Concord Jazz)
 1993 Next Step (Hep)
 1993 Arrival (Jazz Focus)
 1994 Momentum featuring Dick Berk and Jeff Johnson (Jazz Focus)
 1994 Song That I Heard (Hep)
 1994 In the Pocket (Hep)
 1994 Encounters featuring Leroy Vinnegar (Jazz Focus)
 1995 Inventions (Jazz Focus)
 1995 Joy featuring Hadley Caliman (Jazz Focus)
 1995 Intuition (Jazz Focus)
 1996 Gratitude (Candid)
 1996 Jessica's Blues featuring Jay Thomas, Mel Brown and Dave Captein (Jazz Focus)
 1996 Victoria Concert (Jazz Focus)
 1997 Higher Standards (Candid)
 1998 Encounters, Vol. 2 featuring Leroy Vinnegar (Jazz Focus)
 1998 Joyful Sorrow: A Solo Tribute to Bill Evans (BlackHawk)
 1999 In the Key of Monk (Jazz Focus)
 1999 Ain't Misbehavin'  (Candid)
 2000 Jazz in the Afternoon (Candid)
 2000 Blue Fire (Jazz Focus)
 2001 I Let a Song Go Out of My Heart (Hep)
 2001 Some Ballads, Some Blues (Jazz Focus)
 2002 This Side Up featuring Victor Lewis and Ray Drummond (Maxjazz)
 2003 All Alone (Maxjazz)
 2004 Live at Yoshi's, Vol. 1 featuring Victor Lewis and Ray Drummond (Maxjazz)
 2004 The Real Deal (Hep)
 2005 Live at Yoshi's, Vol. 2 featuring Victor Lewis and Ray Drummond (Maxjazz)
 2006 Billy's Theme: A Tribute to Dr. Billy Taylor (Origin)
 2007 Unity (Red and Blue)
 2008 Songs for a New Century (Origin)
 2009 The Art of the Piano (Origin)
 2010 Touch (Origin)
 2011 Freedom Trane (Origin)
 2012 Songs of Earth (Origin)
 2014 With Love (Origin)

With Charlie Rouse
Epistrophy (Landmark, 1989)

References

External links

 (abandoned as of 2021)
 

1948 births
2022 deaths
Post-bop pianists
American jazz pianists
Timeless Records artists
Musicians from Baltimore
Musicians from the San Francisco Bay Area
Women jazz pianists
Jazz musicians from Maryland
Jazz musicians from California
20th-century American women pianists
20th-century American pianists
21st-century American women pianists
21st-century American pianists